Five Moscow conferences took place during and just after World War II among representatives of the United Kingdom, the United States, and the Soviet Union:
 The Moscow Conference (1941), from September 29, 1941, to October 1, 1941
 The Moscow Conference (1942), from August 12, 1942, to August 17, 1942
 The Moscow Conference (1943), from October 18, 1943, to November 11, 1943
 The Moscow Conference (1944), on October 9, 1944
 The Moscow Conference (1945) (also known as the Interim Meeting of Foreign Ministers) between December 16 and December 26, 1945